Odhams Press was a British publishing company, operating from 1920 to 1968. Originally a magazine publisher, Odhams later expanded into book publishing and then children's comics. The company was acquired by Fleetway Publications in 1961 and then IPC Magazines in 1963. In its final incarnation, Odhams was known for its Power Comics line of titles, notable for publishing reprints of American Marvel Comics superheroes.

History

William Odhams; Odhams Bros. 
In 1834 William Odhams left Sherborne, Dorset, for London, where he initially worked for The Morning Post. In 1847, he went into partnership with William Biggar in Beaufort Buildings, Savoy, London; and in the 1870s he started the business known as William Odhams. Originally a jobbing printer and newspaper publisher, William Odhams sold the business to his two sons, John Lynch Odhams and William James Baird Odhams, in 1892. The business, then a small printing firm in Hart Street employing about twenty people, became known as Odhams Bros.

Magazine and book publishing 
Odhams Limited was created in 1898. Julius Elias, who left school at the age of 13 before going to work as an office boy at Odhams Bros,  worked his way up to become managing director and eventually chairman of the firm, which after a merger with John Bull in 1920 took the name Odhams Press Ltd. That same year, the company also founded Ideal Home and acquired the equestrian magazine Horse & Hound.

Odhams acquired a 51% share in the Trades Union Congress paper the Daily Herald in 1930 (by that point, Odhams was already publishing The Sunday People). A promotion campaign ensued, and in 1933, the Herald became the world's best-selling daily newspaper, with certified net sales of 2 million. This accomplishment set off a war with more conservative London papers, such as the Daily Express.

By 1937 Odhams had founded the first colour weekly, Woman, for which it set up and operated a dedicated high-speed print works. Later, Odhams expanded into book publishing, for example publishing Winston Churchill's Painting as a Pastime (1965), Rupert Gunnis's Dictionary of British Sculptors 1660–1851 (1953), and an edition of the complete works of William Shakespeare.

In 1954, Odhams Press Hall was built in Watford, designed by Yates, Cook and Derbyshire. The building was later protected by the Watford Borough Council because of the innovative clock tower, which houses a water tank for use in printing.

In the 1950s, Odhams was one of London's three leading magazine publishers – along with Newnes/Pearson and the Hulton Press.

Throughout the 1960s, Odhams Books Ltd (likewise founded by Odhams Press) operated the Companion Book Club (CBC). This published a large series of hardcover novels.

Children's comics and acquisition by Fleetway/IPC 
Odhams published Mickey Mouse Weekly from the 1930s (acquiring it from Willbank Publications), which featured American reprints as well as original British Disney comics material, including a number of non-Disney-related strips. Odhams lost the rights to Disney characters in 1957, and almost immediately launched the weekly comic Zip, which inherited the non-Disney strips from Mickey Mouse Weekly.

In 1959, Odhams purchased George Newnes Ltd as well as its imprint C. Arthur Pearson Ltd. Notable comics titles originally published by Pearson and continued by Odhams included the romance comics Mirabelle and Marty, and the Picture Stories and Picture Library series.

In 1959–1960, Odhams acquired Hulton Press, renaming it Longacre Press, thus taking over publication of the children's comics Eagle, Girl, Swift, and Robin.

In 1960 Cecil Harmsworth King, chairman of the Daily Mirror newspaper, made an approach to Odhams on behalf of Fleetway Publications (formerly the Amalgamated Press). Odhams' board found this too attractive to refuse and, in 1961, Odhams was taken over by Fleetway.  In 1963 its holdings were amalgamated with those of Fleetway and others to form the International Publishing Corporation (known as IPC). Between 1964 and 1968 Odhams operated as a subsidiary of IPC.

Odhams' "juveniles" (i.e., children's comics) competed for readers with DC Thomson, publisher of such popular titles as The Beano, The Dandy, and Commando. Alf Wallace, who had found success at Fleetway with his line of War Picture Library comics, was brought over to oversee Odhams' comics line. He was, however, unable to reverse the declining popularity of Eagle and Swift, or succeed with Boys' World, launched in 1963. In fact, by early 1964, Swift and Boys' World had both been absorbed by Eagle, which, along with Girl, was then taken over by IPC.

In desperation, Wallace recruited veteran cartoonist Leo Baxendale, who had worked for DC Thomson for many years, to create a new, energetic comics weekly. Baxendale's Wham! debuted on 20 June 1964, breaking the mould of traditional British humour strips with its use of bizarre humour, outrageous puns, and surreal plots. With the success of Wham!, the next title in the new line, Smash!, debuted on 5 February 1966. With Odhams acquiring the Marvel Comics license in early 1966, The Hulk became the first Marvel superhero to show up in an Odhams title when he debuted in Smash! #16 (21 May 1966). The popularity of that strip led to Wham! adding Fantastic Four reprints beginning 6 August 1966. In late 1966, with two Odhams' titles featuring superheroes (and the third, Pow!, on the way), the Power Comics line was created. The line, which also came to include Fantastic and Terrific, was notable for its use of superhero material reprinted from Marvel, serving as an introduction of this new breed of American superheroes to UK readers.

Close of business
In 1968 Odhams encountered financial problems, partly due to unfavourable economic conditions in Britain. As a result of this, and of IPC's desire to rationalise its titles and eliminate duplication, the comics published by the Odhams Press imprint were closed or transferred to IPC Magazines Ltd, another IPC subsidiary. This contained the losses on the Power Comics range within Odhams, which was a limited company with separate liability, but, in consequence, Odhams became financially unviable. On 1 January 1969 it effectively ceased to exist as a publishing business, when publication of its last surviving comics title, Smash!, was taken over by IPC. (In 1971, Smash! merged with the IPC title Valiant.)

Newspapers 
 Daily Herald (1930–1964)
 The Sunday People (circa 1920–circa 1963)
 The Sun (1964–1969)

Magazines 
 Geographical (1965–1968)
 Horse & Hound (from 1920)
 Ideal Home (founded 1920)
 John Bull (1920–1964)
 Kinematograph Weekly
 Leader Magazine
 News Review ( 1940–1950) — merged into Illustrated magazine
 NME (1962–1968)
 Rugby World (from 1960)
 Woman (from 1937)

Book series
 Beacon Books
 Britain Illustrated
 Colourama Series
 Famous Criminal Trials
 Hippo Books
 Man's Book Series
 Modern Living Series
 New Educational Library
 Odhams Owner-Driver Handbooks
 The People's Home Library
 Popular Library
 University Series
 The War in Pictures

Comics titles

See also 
 Morgan v Odhams Press Ltd

References

Notes

Citations

External links
 The IPC Media website
 Howard Cox and Simon Mowatt, "Technology and Industrial Change: The Shift from Production to Knowledge-Based Business in the Magazine Print Publishing Industry", paper presented to the 2001 Association of Business Historians Conference, 2001 (Research Papers in International Business no. 27).

 
1870s establishments in England
1920 establishments in England
1969 disestablishments in England
1961 mergers and acquisitions
Publishing companies established in the 1870s
British companies disestablished in 1969
Fleetway and IPC Comics
Publishing companies established in 1920
Publishing companies disestablished in 1969
Book publishing companies based in London
Disney comics publishers